Simon Sidon or Simon Szidon (1892 in Versec, Kingdom of Hungary – 27 April 1941, Budapest, Hungary) was a reclusive Hungarian mathematician who worked on trigonometric series and orthogonal systems and who introduced Sidon sequences and Sidon sets.

Death
On 27 April 1941, Sidon died from pneumonia in the hospital after a ladder fell on him and broke his leg.

References

External links

20th-century Hungarian mathematicians
1892 births
1941 deaths
Austro-Hungarian mathematicians